Jinonice is a district of Prague, mostly part of Prague 5, but a small area is part of Prague 13. It is located on the north edge of Prokopské údolí national park. Jinonice has been a part of Prague city since 1922.

Part of Jinonice is also the historical Slavic settlement Hradiště Butovice from the 9th century.

The most important local historical monument is the Church of St. Lawrence (Kostel svatého Vavřince), which was built in Romanesque style at the end of the 11th century.

In 1872 the Smíchov – Hostivice railway line was built. The area is also served by Jinonice metro station on line B of the Prague Metro

Education

The Deutsche Schule Prag, the German international school, is in the district.

References

Districts of Prague